Sturminster Newton is a town and civil parish in the Blackmore Vale area of Dorset, England. It is situated on a low limestone ridge in a meander of the River Stour. The town is at the centre of a large dairy agriculture region, around which the town's economy is built. The larger part of the town (Sturminster) lies on the north side of the river, and includes most shops and services, whilst to the south is the smaller Newton. Between these two areas is a wide flood plain. The town was the home of poet and author William Barnes, and, for part of his life, Thomas Hardy. The town has 43 shops, a primary and secondary school, and a school and college catering for children with Special educational needs. In the 2011 census the town's civil parish had a population of 5,234. 

A market is held in the town on Mondays. One of the largest cattle markets in England used to be held here, but it was closed in 1998 and now in its place stands a housing estate and a 300-seat community arts centre called The Exchange. The town is part of the historic West Country Carnival circuit. The town also has the nickname of 'the heart of the Blackmore vale' due to its central location within that area.

History
Sturminster Newton was recorded in the Anglo Saxon charter in 968 as Nywetone at Stoure, and in the Domesday Book as Newentone. Newton refers to a new farm or estate, and Sturminster to a church (minster) on the Stour. Originally the two parts of the name referred to the settlements on the north and south of the river, but were combined to distinguish the town from Sturminster Marshall and other Newtons. The history of the town and surrounding area has been researched by the Sturminster Newton Heritage Trust, which runs the Sturminster Newton Museum in the Old Market Cross House in the centre of town. The Museum is open to visitors on some days every week.

Hidden on the hill above the bridge over the river are the ruins of Sturminster Newton Castle, a manor house rather than a defensive building. The 14th-century building stands on a crescent shaped mound which could be the site of an Iron Age hillfort. The town and castle were part of Sturminster Newton hundred.

Sturminster Newton is situated at a historic fording point on the River Stour. The ford was replaced in the 16th century with a six-arch stone bridge, and a quarter-kilometre embankment crossing the flood plain. A 19th-century plaque affixed to the bridge states that anyone damaging the bridge would be transported to Australia as a felon.

The Sturminster Newton Heritage Trust runs the Sturminster Newton Mill on the south bank of the river and which has existed since at least 1016. The mill was restored in 1980 and is now a working museum watermill which is open to visitors on some days every week between the end of March and the end of September. The mill resumed commercial production of flour in 2020.

The town centre is built in a mixture of styles, including 17th- and 18th-century thatched cottages, Georgian stone buildings, and 19th-century brick buildings. Set back from the main road is the market square and parish church of St Mary, which was rebuilt in 1486 by the abbots of Glastonbury. The church was heavily modified in the 19th century, but the carved wagon roof remains.

From 1863 the Somerset and Dorset Railway ran through the town until 1966 when it was dismantled as part of the Beeching Axe. The railway goods yard gave milk trains access to the private sidings of the local creamery. Started in 1913 by local farmers to produce cheddar cheese and pasteurised milk, it was taken over by the Milk Marketing Board in 1937. Milk trains ceased in 1966 on closure of the line, with the creamery remaining in operation until 2000 under successor Dairy Crest. The station and goods yard were demolished in the mid 1970s.

The town is set in the vale on which Thomas Hardy based his fictional Vale of the little dairies (in his Tess of the d'Urbervilles) and Sturminster had the largest cattle market in Europe, which stood close to the town centre until it was closed and demolished in 1997.

Governance
In the United Kingdom national parliament, Sturminster is in the North Dorset parliamentary constituency which is currently represented by Simon Hoare of the Conservative party. At the top tier of local government Sturminster is governed by Dorset County Council, which has responsibilities that include education, highways and transport, social services, trading standards and libraries. At the middle tier of local government Sturminster is governed by North Dorset District Council, which has responsibilities that include local planning, refuse collection and recycling, building regulations and housing. Since 2006 North Dorset District Council has reduced its direct service provision via a system of decentralised community partnerships with local organisations such as town councils. North Dorset District Council is also in a 'tri-council' partnership with two other district-level councils in Dorset, West Dorset District Council and Weymouth and Portland Borough Council; the aim of the partnership is to reduce costs of management and buildings. At the bottom tier of local government Sturminster is governed by Sturminster Newton Town Council, which has responsibilities that include allotments, public conveniences, the cemetery, grit bins, footway lighting and recreation grounds.

In national parliament and district council elections Sturminster is in Sturminster Newton electoral ward. In national parliamentary elections this is joined with 25 other wards that together elect the Member of Parliament for the North Dorset constituency, and in district council elections the ward joins eighteen other wards within the North Dorset District to elect councillors to North Dorset District Council; the ward elects two councillors out of a total of 33. The Conservative Party has overall control of the district council. In county council elections Sturminster is in Blackmore Vale Electoral Division, one of 42 divisions that each elect councillors to Dorset County Council. The county council has 45 councillors (three divisions elect two councillors each) and the Conservative Party has overall control.

Geography
The geology of the parish comprises Oxford clay in the northwest, Corallian limestone and sands in the northeast, centre and southwest, and Kimmeridge clay in the southeast.

Demography
In the 2011 census the town's civil parish—which also includes the small settlements of Bagber, Broad Oak and Puxey— had 2,016 dwellings, 1,910 households and a population of 4,292.

Culture
Sturminster Newton is the home of the annual UK Boogie Woogie Festival, which in 2009 saw an appearance from veteran boogie woogie star Little Willie Littlefield.

The Exchange, a community arts and conference centre, on Old Market Hill, was built on the site of the old cattle market. It was officially opened, by Julian Fellowes, in December 2007 and provides a venue for music concerts, drama and other events.

The Dorset Bach Cantata Club is based in Sturminster Newton.

International relations

Twin towns
Sturminster Newton is twinned with:
 Montebourg, Normandy, France

Notable people

 Keith Kyle (1925–2007), writer, broadcaster and historian, was born in the town
 Bryan "Badger" Goss (born 1940), Motocross rider
 Mark Price, Baron Price (born 1961), UK Minister of Trade and Investment and former managing director of Waitrose, lives in the town. 
 William Barnes (1801-1886)
 Thomas Hardy (1840-1928) and his wife Emma lived in the town from 1876 to 1878, and he wrote his 1878 The Return of the Native during this time.
Eden Paul (1865–1944), physician, translator, communist activist, was born in the town

See also
 Sturminster Newton High School
 Girdlers Coppice
 Piddles Wood
 List of boroughs in Dorset
 List of hundreds in Dorset
 List of sanitary districts in Dorset
 List of poor law unions in Dorset

References

External links 

 Sturminster Newton community website
 Sturminster Newton Heritage Trust
 Sturminster Newton Museum
 Sturminster Newton Historic Characterisation
 

 
Towns in Dorset
Civil parishes in Dorset
North Dorset District